John Robert Stilgoe (born 1949) is a historian and photographer who is the Robert and Lois Orchard Professor in the History of Landscape at the Visual and Environmental Studies Department of Harvard University, where he has been teaching since 1977. He is also a fellow of the Society of American Historians. He was featured on a 60 Minutes episode in 2004 entitled "The Eyes Have It".

Biography
Stilgoe was born in Norwell, Massachusetts in 1949. His father was a boatbuilder. He graduated from Boston University with a B.A. in 1971, and from Purdue University with an M.A. in 1973. He entered Harvard's Ph.D. program in American Civilizations in 1973, where he studied under J. B. Jackson, a landscape architect known for his studies of vernacular American landscapes.

Educational philosophy
On his Harvard Faculty of Arts and Sciences website, Stilgoe comments,

Education ought to work outdoors, in the rain and the sleet, in the knife-like heat of a summertime Nebraska wheat field, along a half-abandoned railroad track on a dark autumn afternoon, on the North Atlantic in winter. All that I do is urge my students and my readers to look around, to realize how wonderfully rich is the built environment, even if the environment is only a lifeboat close-hauled in a chiaroscuro sea.

Awards 
Francis Parkman Award 
George Hilton Medal 
Bradford Williams Medal 
American Institute of Architects award for collaborative research 
Charles C. Eldredge prize for art-history research

Bibliography 
What is Landscape? (MIT Press, 2015)
Old Fields: Photography, Glamour, and Fantasy Landscape (University of Virginia Press, 2014)
Train Time: Railroads and Imminent Landscape Change (University of Virginia Press, 2007) 
Landscape and Images (University of Virginia Press, 2005)
Lifeboat: A History of Courage, Cravenness, and Survival at Sea (University of Virginia Press, 2003) 
Outside Lies Magic (Walker & Company, 1998)
Alongshore (Yale University Press, 1994) 
Shallow-Water Dictionary: A Grounding in Estuary English (Princeton Architectural Press, 1990, 2nd ed. 2003)
Borderland: Origins of the American Suburb, 1820-1939 (Yale University Press, 1990) 
Metropolitan Corridor: Railroads and the American Scene (Yale University Press, 1983) 
Common Landscape of America, 1580 to 1845 (Yale University Press, 1983)

References

External links
"John Stilgoe's Secret History", The Harvard Crimson, 2 April 2015

Living people
Harvard University faculty
21st-century American historians
21st-century American male writers
American photographers
Harvard University alumni
People from Norwell, Massachusetts
Boston University alumni
Purdue University alumni
1949 births
Historians from Massachusetts
American male non-fiction writers